Ambrose Folorunsho Alli (22 September 1929 – 22 September 1989) was a Nigerian medical professor who served as Executive Governor of the defunct Nigerian state  of Bendel State (now the Nigerian states of Edo and Delta) between 1979 and 1983. He was the first civilian governor.

Background

Ambrose Folorunsho Alli was born in Idoani, Ondo state on 22 September 1929. 
In his childhood he moved between Oka-Odo, Ekpoma, Owo, Efon-Alaye, Benin City and Asaba, where he completed his secondary education in 1948.
He attended the School of Agriculture Ibadan (1948) and the School of Medical Technology, Adeoyo Hospital Ibadan (1953–1960) where he gained an MBBS.
He served as a house office at the Adeoyo hospital from 1960 to 1961.
He went to the United Kingdom for a post-graduate course in neuropathology at the University of London (1961–1966), gaining a D.C. pathology degree. 
Later he studied at the University of Birmingham from 1971 to 1974.

He was a lecturer at the University of Ibadan (1966–1969) and was senior lecturer at the Ahmadu Bello University, Zaria (1969–1974). From 1974 to 1979, Alli was professor of morbid anatomy and head of the department of pathology at the University of Benin, Benin City.

Political career
Following his academic posts, he was elected the Governor of Bendel state, and later founded "Bendel state University" now "Ambrose Alli University", Ekpoma. Many campuses in Ekpoma, Abraka and Asaba were established during his tenure. However, with the creation of Delta State by the administration of Gen. Babangida, the University became two Universities, namely Delta State University, Abraka and Ambrose Alli University, Ekpoma, posthumously named after him. Ambrose Alli was a member of the constituent assembly that drafted the 1978 Nigeria constitution. He joined the Unity Party of Nigeria (UPN) and ran successfully as UPN candidate in the Bendel State governorship election of 1979. He brought massive development to Bendel in different sectors, from the establishment of numerous post-primary schools and tertiary institutions, and massive construction of roads and housing.
His main thrust as governor was to increase educational opportunities. He established over 600 new secondary schools, and abolished secondary school fees. Apart from the establishment of the University, he also established various colleges of Education in Ekiadolor near Benin City, Agbor, Warri, Ozoro and Agbor, and three Polytechnics, with a college of agriculture and fishery proposed  for Agenebode. He also established four teachers training colleges to supply staff to the new schools, as well as several other higher educational institutions. In 1981 he laid the foundation of the Bendel State University, which is now named the Ambrose Alli University, Ekpoma. Other reforms included abolishing charges for services and drugs at state-owned hospitals and eliminating the flat-rate tax.
His administration carried out massive construction of roads to open up the rural areas. In the housing sector he built low cost housing estates in Ugbowo, Ikpoba Hill  in Benin City, and Bendel Estates in Warri. 
As Governor, he always wore sandals, joking that he was so busy working in Government House that he never had time to buy shoes for himself.

Later career

When Ambrose Alli left office in 1983, he retired to his family house.
After the military government of Major-General Muhammadu Buhari took power, he was sentenced to 100 years in prison by a  military tribunal for allegedly misappropriating N983,000 in funds for a road project. He was later freed when the Esama of Benin, Chief Gabriel Igbinedion, paid a fine to the government.
He finally got released from the Prison after the fine amount of one million naira was remitted by chief igbinedion. After the release he was  hosted by sir chief Dr.Ezekiel A.Ainabe. Local Government council Ekpoma honoured  Prof.Alli by launching his statue. Prof.Alli sacrificed his life for the people of Nigeria. In order to pay respect and for the service rendered to the community, Dr.Ezekiel A.Ainabe erected a statue at the market square in  Eguare ekpoma.

Death
Shortly after being released from prison, Ambrose Folorunsho Alli died on his 60th birthday on 22 September 1989, at the Lagos University Teaching Hospital in Lagos. An annual Distinguished Leadership Lecture was later established in his honour.

References

External links
Prof.Ambrose Alli full biography {source edoworld}

 Asomwan Sonnie Adagbonyin 

1929 births
1989 deaths
Unity Party of Nigeria politicians
State governors of Nigeria
Academic staff of the University of Ibadan
Academic staff of Ahmadu Bello University
People from Ondo State
Alumni of the University of London
20th-century Nigerian politicians
Prisoners and detainees of Nigeria
Academic staff of the University of Benin (Nigeria)
Ambrose Alli University people
Founders of Nigerian schools and colleges
University and college founders
20th-century Nigerian educators
Nigerian educational theorists